Thomas Alder (1 January 1932 in Murnau am Staffelsee, Germany – 6 May 1968 in Munich, Germany) was a German actor.

On 6 May 1968 he committed suicide by gas at age 36.

Selected filmography
 The Crimson Circle (1960)
 Hit Parade 1960 (1960)
 We Will Never Part (1960)
  (1962)
 Two Bavarians in Bonn (1962)
 Massacre at Marble City (1964)
 Holiday in St. Tropez (1964)
 13 Days to Die (1965)
 The Sinful Village (1966)
 Come to the Blue Adriatic (1966)
  (1966)

References

External links
 

1932 births
1968 deaths
German male film actors
People from Garmisch-Partenkirchen (district)
20th-century German male actors
1968 suicides
Suicides by gas
Suicides in Germany